Opinions On Strengthening The Programme Management of Satellite Television Channels is a government directive ordered by the State Administration of Press, Publication, Radio, Film and Television (SAPPRFT) of China in 2011, aiming at stopping the over-emphasis on purely entertainment programmes in the satellite television channels in China.

Background
Since the late 2000s, there was a trend of producing purely entertainment programmes in various satellite television channels in China. Examples included Super Girl, Fei Cheng Wu Rao (If You Are The One), Day Day Up, Happy Camp, China's Got Talent, etc.

SAPPRFT, being responsible for the supervision of state-owned enterprises engaged in the television, radio, and  film industries, is of the opinions that the satellite TV channels in China focus too much on purely entertainment programmes and are hence creating drawbacks on public opinions, and thus would like to impose a stricter control on the content of the programmes broadcast in the satellites TV channels.

Directive
The policy was announced in 2011 and imposed in 2012.  The targets of the policy are only those satellite TV channels, not including CCTV and non-satellite provincial TV channels.  SAPPRFT focused on the following seven genres of programmes:

 Dating game show
 Talent show
 Variety show about love stories
 Game show
 General variety show
 Talk show
 Reality television

SAPPRFT required that there should not be more than nine programmes of the above genres from 19:30 to 22:00 every day in all satellite TV channels as a whole, and each channel should not broadcast more than 2 programmes of the above genres every week and not more than 90 minutes every day.

SAPPRFT also demanded the satellite TV channels increase the proportion of documentary programmes, news programmes, educational programmes, programmes for children and youth, and also programmes about economic issues and science.

SAPPRFT also impose a policy requiring the TV channels to limit the participation of actors coming from Taiwan and Hong Kong.

Effects
The policy had a great impact on those TV channels that had been focusing on producing entertainment programmes, among which included Hunan Television (湖南卫视), Dragon Television (東方卫视), Jiangsu Television (江苏卫视), Zhejiang Television (浙江卫视), Shenzhen Satellite TV (深圳卫视). Some of the programmes that had been planned needed to be suspended.

For those others satellite TV channels that had not been focusing on entertainment programmes, the policy did not have a very large impact.

References

2011 in Chinese television